Sullivan is a town in Madison County, New York, United States. The population was 15,339 at the 2010 census. The town is named after General John Sullivan.

The Town of Sullivan is located in the northwestern corner of the county.

History 
Settlement began around 1790. The town was established in 1803 from the Town of Cazenovia. In 1809, the town was partitioned to form the Town of Lenox.

The Chittenango Landing Dry Dock Complex was listed on the National Register of Historic Places in 1992.

Geography

The northern border of the town is Oneida Lake, and the western border is the Chittenango Creek.

The New York State Thruway (Interstate 90) passes across the town.

Demographics

At the 2010 census, there were 15,339 people, 6,114 households and 4,325 families residing in the town. The population density was 209.7 per square mile (80.97/km2). There were 6,723 housing units at an average density of 91.7 per square mile (35.5/km2). The racial makeup of the town was 97.2% White, 0.6% African American, 0.4% Native American, 0.4% Asian, 0.2% from other races, and 1.2% from two or more races. Hispanic or Latino of any race were 1.2% of the population.

There were 6,114 households, of which 31.5% had children under the age of 18 living with them, 54.5% were heterosexual married couples living together, 10.8% had a primary female householder, 5.1% had a primary male householder and 29.6% were non-families. 23.2% of all households were made up of individuals, and 7.3% had someone living alone who was 65 years of age or older. The average household size was 2.48 and the average family size was 2.91.

24.6% of the population were under the age of 19, 4.9% from 20 to 24, 28% from 25 to 44, 32.3% from 45 to 64, and 15% who were 65 years of age or older. The median age was 43.5 years. 49.2% identified as male, while 50.8 identified as female.

The median household income was $56,596 and the median family income was $64,101. People identifying as male had a median income of $40,906 and people identifying as female $31,115. In 2018, the per capita income was $32,971, about 8.6% of the population were below the poverty line.

Communities and locations in Sullivan 
Blakeslea – A hamlet in the southeastern corner of the town.
Bolivar – A hamlet northeast of Chittenango village.
Bridgeport – A hamlet in the northwest of the town by the town line on NY-31 at the Chittenango Creek.
Chittenango  – The Village of Chittanango and the location of the town government is in the southern part of the town.
Chittenango Creek – A stream that forms the northwestern boundary of the town.
Chittenango Springs – A hamlet south of Chittenango village on Route 13.
East Boston –  A location near the eastern town line.
Eaton Corners – A location south of Lakeport.
Fyler Settlement – a hamlet in the northwestern part of the town.
Gees Corner – A location in the northeastern part of the town.
Lake Oneida Beach West – A lakeside hamlet on the shore of Oneida Lake.
Lakeport – A hamlet on Oneida Lake and Route 31.
Messenger Bay – A lakeside hamlet in the northeastern corner of the town.
North Chittenango – A hamlet south of the Thruway on Lakeport Road.
Oneida Lake Beach West – A lakeside hamlet in the northern part of the town. The Oneida Lake Congregational Church was listed on the National Register of Historic Places in 2006.
Peck Corner – A location in the northwestern part of the town at County Routes 1 and 4.
Sullivan – A hamlet east of Chittenango village on Route 5 and 13.
Weaver Corner – A location near Chittenango Creek in the northwestern part of the town.

Transportation
Luther Airport is located one nautical mile (1.85 km) east of the central business district of Chittenango.

Notable people
Augustus and John Allen, founders of Houston, Texas

Gallery

See also 
 Old Erie Canal State Historic Park

References

External links
  Town of Sullivan government site
  Early Sullivan history

Syracuse metropolitan area
1803 establishments in New York (state)
Populated places established in 1803
Towns in Madison County, New York